Michał Żurek (born 3 June 1988) is a Polish former professional volleyball player.

Career
In 2012, Żurek joined Indykpol AZS Olsztyn. He spent there two seasons. In 2014, he signed a contract with Asseco Resovia.

Honours

Clubs
 CEV Champions League
  2014/2015 – with Asseco Resovia

 National championships
 2014/2015  Polish Championship, with Asseco Resovia

Youth national team
 Beach volleyball
 2005  CEV U18 European Championship, with Radosław Zbierski

References

External links

 
 Player profile at PlusLiga.pl 
 Player profile at Volleybox.net

Living people
1988 births
People from Kędzierzyn-Koźle
Sportspeople from Opole Voivodeship
Polish men's volleyball players
Trefl Gdańsk players
Effector Kielce players
AZS Olsztyn players
Resovia (volleyball) players
BKS Visła Bydgoszcz players
Warta Zawiercie players
Liberos